Bohnenberger is a lunar impact crater that lies near the east edge of the Mare Nectaris, in the foothills of the Montes Pyrenaeus mountain range that forms the perimeter of the mare. To the east beyond the mountains is the larger crater Colombo. The crater has a low rim along the north wall, and the floor is somewhat irregular with a ridge crossing the floor. There is a small crater along the western inner wall.

The name of the crater was approved by the IAU in 1935 and refers to German astronomer Johann von Bohnenberger.

Satellite craters
By convention these features are identified on lunar maps by placing the letter on the side of the crater midpoint that is closest to Bohnenberger.

References

External links

Impact craters on the Moon